The sexual abuse scandal in the Catholic diocese of Orange is an important chapter in the Catholic sexual abuse scandal in the United States.

Allegations of sexual misconduct

Allegations against bishop Driscoll
During his tenure as an auxiliary bishop in the diocese of Orange, Michael Patrick Driscoll accepted and transferred priests despite reports of sexual misconduct. 

In 1983, he received a letter detailing allegations of abuse against another priest, who was sent to counseling but the therapist who treated him never reported the case to Child Protective Services as required by law; when authorities asked for the letter, Driscoll claimed the victim's mother had asked for it to be destroyed, which the mother denied.

He later admitted that his priorities were "horribly misplaced" in handling these allegations, and stated, "...I would never hurt anyone intentionally, especially children."

Diocese of Boise Bishop Michael Driscoll apologized for his role in Orange County, California's Roman Catholic Church sex-abuse scandal. Driscoll, who was in charge of priest personnel affairs for the Diocese of Orange County from its 1976 inception until leaving for Idaho in 1999, made the stunning admission in a letter printed in the Idaho Catholic Register, stating he was "deeply sorry that the way we handled cases [in Orange County] allowed children to be victimized by permitting some priests to remain in ministry, for not disclosing their behavior to those who might be at risk, and for not monitoring their actions more closely."
A Los Angeles Superior Court judge was expected to release priest personnel files that were supposed to become public as part of a $100-million settlement reached in 2005 between the Orange diocese and sex-abuse victims, the largest in the history of the Catholic Church. Church sources say Driscoll's name is all over the documents, which molestation survivors claim will show the various cover-ups Orange County diocesan officials executed while Driscoll served as chancellor and auxiliary bishop.

Allegations against Bishop Tod Brown
In 1997, Bishop Tod Brown was accused of having sexually abused a twelve-year-old boy in 1965, while Brown was a pastor in Bakersfield. However, following a preliminary investigation, Church officials dismissed the claims, saying, "[Brown's life] does not reveal any inappropriate behavior..." He denied the allegation, declaring in 2007, "I've never abused any person sexually or any other way."

Allegations against Michael A. Harris
In 2003, nine men sued the diocese alleging that Msgr. Michael A. Harris, their former principal, sexually assaulted them while they attended Mater Dei High School in Santa Ana or Santa Margarita High School in Rancho Santa Margarita. Harris quit the priesthood in 2001 after the Los Angeles and Orange dioceses paid $5.2 million to one of his alleged victims.

Settlement
On January 3, 2005 Bishop Tod Brown of the Diocese of Orange apologized to 87 alleged victims of sexual abuse and announced a settlement of $100 million following two years of mediation. The suits alleged sexual misconduct on the part of 30 priests, 2 nuns, 1 religious brother, and 10 lay personnel into the 1980s; 11 claims were against Eleuterio Ramos and 9 against Siegfried Widera, both deceased (Widera by suicide). About 25 cases involved abuse dating before the creation of the Diocese of Orange, one to 1936.

It was the first settlement in California arising from the Roman Catholic Church sex abuse scandal of the late 20th and early 21st centuries, and remained the largest settlement (though not the largest judgment) arising out of the scandal until the Archdiocese of Los Angeles announced a $660 million settlement on July 15, 2007. About half of the sum was covered by liability insurance.

Impact of settlement on the diocese
The diocese had sharply cut costs to prepare for the settlement in the preceding months. These steps enabled the Diocese of Orange to agree to the settlement without closing parishes, or other severe measures taken by other U.S. dioceses in dealing with the scandal.

2019 legal action
From May to December 2019, the Diocese of Orange provided numerous documents to California State Attorney General Xavier Becerra in preparation for a series of pending lawsuits which are expected to be filed after a new California law which will temporarily remove the statute of limitations goes into effect on January 1, 2020. The Diocese of Orange is one of six Catholic dioceses throughout the state of California which is expected to be subpoenaed in the upcoming lawsuits.

See also

Abuse
Charter for the Protection of Children and Young People
Child abuse
Child sexual abuse
Essential Norms
National Review Board
Pontifical Commission for the Protection of Minors
Religious abuse
Sexual abuse
Sexual misconduct
Spiritual abuse

References

External links
Audits, Child And Youth Protection; US Conference of Catholic Bishops
Charter For The Protection Of Children And Young People; US Conference of Catholic Bishops
Child And Youth Protection; US Conference of Catholic Bishops
National Review Board,  Child And Youth Protection; US Conference of Catholic Bishops
Safe Environment, Child And Youth Protection; US Conference of Catholic Bishops
Victim Assistance, Child And Youth Protection; US Conference of Catholic Bishops

Catholic Church sexual abuse scandals in the United States
Incidents of violence against boys
Violence against children
Violence against men in North America